The First Australian Recording Industry Association Music Awards (generally known as the ARIA Music Awards or simply The ARIAS) was held on 2 March 1987 at the Sheraton Wentworth Hotel in Sydney with Elton John as the host. The awards were introduced by ARIA Chairman, Paul Turner, who explained the nomination and voting procedures. Presenters of the 20 awards included Slim Dusty, Basia Bonkowski and Donnie Sutherland. The ceremony was not televised. The most successful artist was John Farnham with his album (Whispering Jack) and its associated single, "You're the Voice" helping him win six awards.

History

Countdown was an Australian pop music TV series on national broadcaster ABC-TV from 1974–1987, it presented music awards from 1979–1987, initially in conjunction with magazine TV Week which had sponsored the previously existing 'King of Pop' Awards. After Cold Chisel performed at the 1980 awards ceremony, and then trashed their instruments and the set, sponsors TV Week withdrew their support and Countdown held its own awards ceremonies until the 1986 awards which were broadcast in 1987. The awards ceremony was co-produced by Carolyn James (aka Carolyn Bailey) during 1981–1984 in collaboration with the Australian Recording Industry Association (ARIA), which provided peer voting for some awards. Countdown provided coupons in the related Countdown Magazine for viewers to vote for some awards including 'Most Popular Male Performer', 'Most Popular Female Performer', 'Most Popular Group' and 'Most Popular International Act'. At the 1985 awards ceremony (held in April 1986) fans of INXS and Uncanny X-Men scuffled and as a result ARIA decided to hold their own awards.

ARIA instituted its own entirely peer-voted Australian Record Industry Awards. The first awards ceremony was held on 2 March 1987 at the Sheraton Wentworth Hotel in Sydney with Elton John as the host. The awards were introduced by ARIA Chairman, Paul Turner, who explained the nomination and voting procedures. The eligibility period was for material released in the previous calendar year with the final five nominees determined by independent auditors, Deloitte, Haskin & Sells. Presenters of the 20 awards included John, Turner, promoter-manager Glenn Wheatley, Country music veteran Slim Dusty, Music Around the World host Basia Bonkowski, and Sounds Unlimited host Donnie Sutherland. The 1987 ceremony was not televised, host John recommended that it not be televised in future:

Anthony O'Grady, an Australian music journalist, cited ARIA founder and spokesperson Peter Rix, "Not that the first awards would have been allowed on TV ... The boys and girls really let their hair down that night – every acceptance speech was crammed with expletive-deletives." John Farnham was the most successful artist on the night, with his album Whispering Jack and its associated single, "You're the Voice" winning six awards from ten nominations.

Awards and nominations

Winners are listed first and bolded, other final nominees (where known) are listed alphabetically.

ARIA Awards
Album of the Year
John Farnham –Whispering Jack
Crowded House – Crowded House
Hunters & Collectors – Human Frailty
Paul Kelly & the Coloured Girls – Gossip
Spy vs Spy – A.O. Mod. TV. Vers.
Single of the Year
John Farnham – "You're the Voice"
Crowded House – "Don't Dream It's Over"
Hunters & Collectors – "Say Goodbye"
INXS & Jimmy Barnes – "Good Times"
Paul Kelly & the Coloured Girls – "Before Too Long"
Highest Selling Album
John Farnham – Whispering Jack
Dragon – Dreams of Ordinary Men
Icehouse - Measure for Measure
Kevin 'Bloody' Wilson – Kev's Back
Rodney Rude – Rude Rides Again
Spy vs Spy – A.O. Mod. TV. Vers.
Tim Finn – Big Canoe
Highest Selling Single
John Farnham – "You're the Voice"
Boom Crash Opera – "Great Wall"
Do-Re-Mi – "Guns and Butter"
Dragon – "Dreams of Ordinary Men"
INXS & Jimmy Barnes – "Good Times"
Pseudo Echo – "Funky Town"
Wa Wa Nee – "Stimulation"
Best Group
INXS – "Listen Like Thieves"
Crowded House – "Don't Dream It's Over"
Hunters & Collectors – Human Frailty
Midnight Oil – The Dead Heart
Pseudo Echo – "Funky Town"
Best Female Artist
Jenny Morris – "You're Gonna Get Hurt"
Jean Stafford – Burning Bright
Jo Kennedy – The Pack of Women
Renée Geyer – Renée Live at the Basement
Wendy Matthews – "Dancing Daze"
Best Male Artist
John Farnham – Whispering Jack
Jimmy Barnes – "Good Times"
Martin Plaza – Plaza Suite
Paul Kelly – Gossip
Tim Finn – Big Canoe
Best New Talent
Crowded House – "Don't Dream It's Over"
Big Pig – "Hungry Town"
Boom Crash Opera – "Great Wall", "Hands up in the Air"
Ups and Downs – "The Living Kind"
Wa Wa Nee – "Stimulation"
Best Country Album 
John Williamson – Mallee Boy
Jean Stafford – Burning Bright
Johnny Chester – There's a Shadow on the Moon Tonight
Slim Dusty – Stories I Wanted to Tell
The Three Chord Wonders – Try Change
Best Indigenous Release
Coloured Stone – Human Love
Dave de Hugard – The Magpie in the Wattle
John Williamson – Mallee Boy
Sirocco – Voyage
The Three Chord Wonders – Try Change
Best Adult Contemporary Album
John Farnham – Whispering Jack
Dragon – Dreams of Ordinary Men
Mondo Rock – Boom Baby Boom
The Reels – "Bad Moon Rising"
Vince Jones – Tell Me a Secret
Best Comedy Release 
Kevin 'Bloody' Wilson – Kev's Back
Austen Tayshus – "Do the Pope"
Mary Kenneally, Steve Blackburn – Australia You're Standing In It
Rodney Rude – Rude Rides Again
Vince Sorrenti – Unbelievable

Fine Arts Awards
Best Jazz Album 
The George Golla Orchestra – Lush Life
Dick Hughes – The Last Train for Casablanca Leaves Once in a Blue Moon
Maree Montgomery – Woman of Mystery
Various Artists – The Esso Australian Jazz Summit
Vince Jones – Tell Me a Secret
Best Classical Album 
Barry Conyngham – Southern Cross / Ice Carving
Australian Chamber Orchestra – Mozart in Delphi
Grant Foster – Rhapsody for Piano and Orchestra
Robert Allworth - Last Look at Bronte
Sydney University Chamber Choir – The Victoria Requiem
Best Original Soundtrack / Cast / Show Recording
Robyn Archer – The Pack of Women
Martin Armiger – Dancing Daze
Nathan Waks – For Love Alone
Peter Best – "Crocodile" Dundee
Peter Carey, Martin Armiger – Illusion

Artisan Awards
Best Songwriter
Neil Finn – Crowded House – "Mean to Me", "Don't Dream It's Over", "Now We're Getting Somewhere"
Eric McCusker – Mondo Rock – "Rule of Three", John Farnham – "No One Comes Close"
Garry Gary Beers, Andrew Farriss, Jon Farriss, Tim Farriss, Michael Hutchence, Kirk Pengilly – INXS – "Listen Like Thieves"
Paul Gray – Wa Wa Nee – "Stimulation", "I Could Make You Love Me"
Paul Kelly – "Before Too Long"
Producer of the Year 
Mark Opitz – Models – Models' Media, The Reels – "Bad Moon Rising", INXS & Jimmy Barnes – "Good Times", Noiseworks – No Lies, Jump Incorporated – "Sex and Fame"
Alan Thorne – Paul Kelly & the Coloured Girls – Gossip
Brian Canham – Pseudo Echo – "Funky Town"
Charles Fisher – Tango Bravo – "Blood Is the Colour", The Cockroaches – "Wait Up", Martin Plaza – Plaza Suite
Ross Fraser – John Farnham – Whispering Jack, John Justin – "Flash King Cadillac"
Engineer of the Year 
Alan Wright – Jump Incorporated – "Sex and Fame"
Doug Brady – John Farnham – Whispering Jack
Guy Gray – Flotsam Jetsam – Show Me
Jim Taig – Wa Wa Nee – Wa Wa Nee
John Bee – Doug Mulray & the Rude Band – "You Are Soul"
Best Video 
Alex Proyas – Crowded House – "Don't Dream It's Over"
Alex Proyas – INXS – "Kiss the Dirt"
Julie Stone Productions – Big Pig – "Hungry Town"
Kimble Rendall – Boom Crash Opera – "Hands up in the Air"
Tony Leitch, Andrew de Groot – Hunters & Collectors – "Everything's on Fire"
Best Cover Art 
Oleh Witer – Big Pig – Big Pig
Art Scarff – Australian Crawl – The Final Wave
Buster Stiggs – Pseudo Echo – Love an Adventure
Nick Seymour – Crowded House – Crowded House
Richard Alan – Models – Models' Media; I'm Talking – Bear Witness
Steve Malpass – John Farnham – Whispering Jack

References

External links
ARIA Awards official website
List of 1987 winners

1987 music awards
1987 in Australian music
ARIA Music Awards